Kozy is an urban area in Silesian Voivodeship in southern Poland.

Kozy may also refer to:
Kozy, Kuyavian-Pomeranian Voivodeship (north-central Poland)
Kozy, Pomeranian Voivodeship (north Poland)
Kozy, Gmina Lipnica in Pomeranian Voivodeship (north Poland)
Kozy, West Pomeranian Voivodeship (north-west Poland)